The Fort Lyttleton Site, located in Beaufort County, South Carolina, is significant for its rich and layered artifacts and structural remains., These provide a composite view of land use since colonial times. In the 18th century and early into the 19th century, the land was primarily used for military purposes. In the late 19th century, the "phosphate period" followed the military period. Shipbuilding became important in the early 20th century. The Fort Lyttleton Site was listed in the National Register of Historic Places on September 13, 1979.

References

Archaeological sites on the National Register of Historic Places in South Carolina
Lyttleton
Geography of Beaufort County, South Carolina
National Register of Historic Places in Beaufort County, South Carolina
Buildings and structures in Beaufort, South Carolina